Hurricane Juan was a significant tropical cyclone that heavily damaged parts of Atlantic Canada in late September 2003. Juan is also the first hurricane name and one of two to be requested to be retired by the Meteorological Service of Canada (the other being Igor of 2010). It was the tenth named storm and the sixth hurricane of the 2003 Atlantic hurricane season. Juan formed southeast of Bermuda on September 24 from a tropical wave that had tracked across the subtropical Atlantic Ocean. It tracked northward and strengthened over the warm waters of the Gulf Stream, reaching Category 2 strength on the Saffir-Simpson hurricane scale on September 27. The hurricane peaked in intensity with sustained winds of  that same day, losing some strength as it raced over cooler waters toward the coast of Nova Scotia. Juan retained hurricane strength while crossing Nova Scotia from south to north, though it weakened to a Category 1 storm over Prince Edward Island. It was absorbed by another extratropical low later on September 29 near Anticosti Island in the northern Gulf of Saint Lawrence.

The hurricane inflicted extensive damage across central Nova Scotia and into Prince Edward Island, with lesser damage east and west of the storm centre. Most of the damage occurred as a result of the intense winds that buffeted the region. Juan's passage resulted in eight fatalities and over CA $300 million (US$200 million) in damage. It was described as the worst storm to hit Halifax since 1893.

Meteorological history

A large tropical wave accompanied by a broad area of low pressure moved off the coast of  Africa on September 14, 2003. It initially tracked westward and remained disorganized due to unfavourable upper-level wind shear. On September 20, the convection around the system greatly increased during interaction with the circulation of a large upper-level low, though unfavorable conditions caused the activity to remain disorganized. The system as a whole moved to the northwest around the upper-level low and developed a mid-level circulation. Later that day, a low-level circulation developed within the system, though its involvement with the proximate frontal zone prevented it from being classified a tropical depression. Deep convection increased near the centre on September 24, and the system quickly developed banding features and distinct outflow. Operationally, the agency did not initiate storm advisories until 27 hours after the time of its formation determined by post-hurricane season analysis.

Initially, the depression possessed a combination of tropical and subtropical characteristics; it remained attached to a nearby frontal zone, though the organization of the convection and a warm core within the system resulted in classification as a tropical cyclone. However, the depression steadily organized and had strengthened into Tropical Storm Juan by early September 25. On September 26, an eye feature developed, and very deep convection increased around the circulation. At this peak strength, the eye of the hurricane was distinct and embedded within a well-defined and round central dense overcast.

Hurricane Juan remained at peak intensity for over 24 hours. After moving northwestward for an extended period of time, it turned and accelerated to the north. The eye became less distinct on September 28, and the hurricane weakened slightly. It weakened quickly while rapidly moving across the southern Canadian Maritimes and crossing the Nova Scotia peninsula as a hurricane. Juan had diminished to a tropical storm as it moved over Prince Edward Island by early September 29. Later that afternoon, the storm was absorbed by a large extratropical low over the northwestern Gulf of Saint Lawrence.

Preparations
The first advisories were issued by the Canadian Hurricane Centre on September 26, although at that time they broadly suggested the possibility existed for wind and rain across Atlantic Canada. As Juan approached on September 27, warning broadcasts on local media in Atlantic Canada were changed accordingly. The public and emergency officials in the expected landfall area were told to make preparations for a potential disaster, after the CHC bulletins indicated the possibility existed for significant wind damage and flooding from both heavy rain and storm surges, as well as power outages.

On the morning of September 28, reports indicated that Juan would make landfall either as a tropical storm or marginal Category 1 hurricane. Weather broadcasts up to that time gave every indication that the storm would weaken prior to landfall. By 6 p.m. ADT (2100 UTC), additional warnings had been issued since Juan was expected to make landfall as a strong Category 1 or weak Category 2 hurricane. Most businesses in the areas affected were closed on Sundays, which meant that preparations could not be made at the last minute. Although no large-scale evacuations were made, local evacuations for low-lying areas were issued on the evening of September 28. In all, several hundred people were affected by these evacuations. Utility workers also stood on standby before the storm hit, preparing for large-scale power outages.

Impact

Nova Scotia

Significant erosion occurred on the populated shores of the harbour, particularly in the Bedford Basin where residential properties and railway tracks received most of the wave action. Rainfall was fairly light due to the fast movement and dry air on the southern side of the storm.

Juan caused widespread structural and vegetation damage across the region, particularly in and around the Halifax Regional Municipality. Extensive damage to trees was reported, which blocked many streets and knocked down power lines. Many homes and businesses suffered property damage, particularly roof damage on structures, and some weaker structures were destroyed. HRM estimated that 31% of residential homes suffered some degree of damage and 27% of homes had enough damage to warrant an insurance claim. In Downtown Halifax, erosion-control boulders the size of garbage cans were hurled from Halifax Harbour onto boardwalks and parking lots and piers. The Victoria General Hospital experienced roof and water damage and was evacuated during the storm, as were numerous tall apartment buildings and other multi-family residences. Billboards and signs were also destroyed, and dozens of vehicles were crushed by trees and other debris. The city's cherished Point Pleasant Park and Public Gardens suffered massive loss of trees and remained closed for months.

Juan set an all-time maximum wind gust speed record at the Halifax Stanfield International Airport; during the peak of the storm, a gust reached 143 km/h, a record which still stands to this day. Another high windspeed occurred at the McNabs Island autostation, which recorded a 2-minute sustained wind of 151 km/h, with gusts to 176 km/h. Hurricane-force gusts extended as far east as Beaver Island, where gusts reached 132 km/h. The hurricane was strong enough to destroy the anemometers at Shannon Hill, Chebucto Head and Sambro Island, even though the Sambro Island instrument had survived a 193 km/h storm some years earlier.

The hurricane caused severe damage to shipping in Halifax Harbour. A visiting recreational schooner named Larinda was sunk at the wharf beside the Maritime Museum of the Atlantic and a harbour tour ketch Mar was driven ashore in Eastern Passage on the opposite side of Halifax Harbour. Another harbour tour vessel, the tern schooner Silva, broke from her moorings and caused extensive damage to the Cable Wharf on the Halifax Waterfront. Dozens of smaller yachts were also driven ashore; extensive damage occurred to yacht clubs in the Bedford Basin and Northwest Arm. Dozens of containers were knocked off two container ships at the South End Container Terminal. Wharves on the Halifax and Dartmouth waterfront suffered large amounts of damage and several railcars were washed into the harbour at the Dartmouth railway yard; one of the tracks for the double-track main line was washed out in several places along the Bedford Basin near Millview. Coastal flooding was also reported around Halifax Harbour as a result of the storm surge, although inland flooding was minor as rainfall was not heavy due to Juan's fast forward movement.

Less severe property damage was recorded west of the storm's track into St. Margarets Bay and Mahone Bay. In addition to Halifax Regional Municipality's urban core, the town of Truro and all of rural Colchester County as well as the western part of Pictou County experienced property damage and power outages from falling trees; numerous barns and other agricultural buildings were damaged east of the storm's path, including a replica of the Hector in Pictou Harbour. The severity of property damage in the metropolitan areas of Halifax and Dartmouth of Halifax Regional Municipality initially led some forecasters to believe that Juan was likely a Category 3 hurricane; however, the sustained wind reports did not justify that suggestion. Many of the deciduous trees in central Nova Scotia still had leaves, which magnified the effects of wind damage. Overall, the number of damaged trees was estimated to be in the millions.

Juan claimed six lives (two directly) in Nova Scotia. Both of the direct deaths were due to fallen trees; one was a Halifax paramedic and the other was a motorist in Enfield. Three of the four indirect deaths were as a result of a house fire started by candles when electricity was cut, and the fourth was in relief work after the storm.

Rest of Atlantic Canada

The storm maintained Category 1 strength as it tracked across Nova Scotia and into the Northumberland Strait, weakening to a tropical storm as it emerged into the Gulf of Saint Lawrence.

Damage was also reported in Prince Edward Island as a result of the storm, particularly around Charlottetown, where its waterfront sustained heavy wave damage to pleasure craft and sea walls, as well as significant damage to the older urban forest in that city's downtown core. Extensive tree damage was also reported across the island, as well as structural damage to weaker buildings, such as barns and silos. The hurricane left portions of the island without power. The narrow path meant that damage was quite localized; little damage was reported in New Brunswick or western Prince Edward Island. Voting in the PEI general election on September 29 was also disrupted, though more than 80% of voters made it to polling stations.

Two deaths were reported in the Gulf of Saint Lawrence off the remote Anticosti Island in Quebec. They were fishermen from New Brunswick operating near Anticosti Island.

Aftermath

In the hours following the storm a state of emergency was declared in Halifax Regional Municipality and parts of neighbouring East Hants Municipal District and Colchester County. The Government of Nova Scotia requested that the federal government deploy 600 Canadian Forces personnel to assist local authorities in HRM with cleanup in the urban area and to assist utility crews with electrical power restoration. Many utility workers, especially those employed by Nova Scotia Power and the dozens of crews from Maritime Electric and NB Power who responded under mutual assistance agreements, worked intensively for almost three weeks.

The devastated Point Pleasant Park remained closed for cleanup after the storm before re-opening in June 2004, nine months after the storm hit, with a damaged shoreline and almost 85% of its trees removed. A revitalization and reforestation program began in 2005.

The Government of Nova Scotia pledged $10 million (2003 CAD) in relief money after the hurricane hit, and private contributions were also made quickly after the storm hit. Prince Edward Island also pledged $200,000 (2003 CAD) immediately after the hurricane hit, and the federal government also announced their own package. The Mayor of Toronto at the time, Mel Lastman, also contributed $50,000 (2003 CAD) to replace damaged trees in Prince Edward Island.

Hurricane Juan alerted residents, governments, utilities, and emergency management agencies throughout Atlantic Canada to improve preparations for devastating events such as hurricanes, especially with climatological data pointing to possible increased frequency of major ocean storms and extratropical cyclones. In addition to Juan, three other storms — Fabian, Isabel and Kate — had a significant effect on land or offshore in Canada during the 2003 Atlantic hurricane season.

Preparations and planning have been underway since 2003 and were first tested when Hurricane Ophelia was forecast to brush near Nova Scotia in early September 2005. Hurricane Juan has also resulted in several changes to the Meteorological Service of Canada's Canadian Hurricane Centre, which has relocated from a vulnerable and exposed location in an office building in Dartmouth, Nova Scotia, to a more secure location that can withstand hurricane damage. CHC's hurricane warning system has also been improved; traditionally, CHC did not issue standard hurricane or tropical storm watches or warnings, just high wind and heavy rainfall warnings, which were often not heeded by local residents. Beginning in the 2004 Atlantic hurricane season, CHC began using standard hurricane warnings for storms potentially affecting Canada.

Hurricane Juan lent its name to a severe blizzard that struck Nova Scotia and Prince Edward Island a few months later in February 2004 which quickly became known as White Juan because the paralyzing effects of the massive snowfall evoked the recent hurricane.

Retirement
Because of its effects in Canada, the name Juan was retired in April 2004 and will never be used again for an Atlantic hurricane. Environment Canada noted that its request for retirement was "in consideration of the lost and damaged lives, the impact to economy, and the widespread destruction of trees throughout two provinces". It was the first time that the Meteorological Service of Canada had specifically requested a hurricane name be retired. The name was replaced by Joaquin for the 2009 season, but since it was not used during that year, it was used in the 2015 season.

See also

 List of Atlantic hurricanes
 List of retired Atlantic hurricane names
 Timeline of the 2003 Atlantic hurricane season
 List of Canada hurricanes
 Hurricane Noel (2007) - Similar approach to Juan 
 Hurricane Igor (2010) – A Category 4 hurricane which struck Newfoundland
 Hurricane Fiona (2022) – A Category 4 hurricane that hit Canada

References

External links

 
 Environment Canada summary of Hurricane Juan (2003)
 CTV Hurricane Juan retrospective story
 Novaweather Storm Page – Chris Fogarty's study of the storm

2003 Atlantic hurricane season
Category 2 Atlantic hurricanes
History of Halifax, Nova Scotia
Natural disasters in Nova Scotia
Natural disasters in Prince Edward Island
Hurricanes in Canada
Retired Atlantic hurricanes
Hurricane Juan
Tropical cyclones in 2003